Savoia 1908 is an Italian association football club located in Torre Annunziata, Campania. It currently plays in Eccellenza.
It is one of the oldest companies in southern Italy. It was founded on 21 November 1908 by a group of industrial mills and pasta factories, with the help of other characters from the middle-class of Torre Annunziata. The social color is white, the color of the raw material of Torre Annunziata economy of the time: the flour. The symbol of the club is the stylized Savoy shield and plays its home games in the Alfredo Giraud Stadium. They won the championship of Southern Italy in 1924, obtaining the honor to face the national champions of Genoa.

History

From U.S. Savoia to U.S. Torrese 
Founded in 1908 as Unione Sportiva Savoia, after the homonymous Italian royal family at the time, the team played the Italian Serie A league finals in 1924, losing to Genoa C.F.C.
In 1915 the company became affiliated to the Italian Football Federation and the first official tournament played was the International Cup, played in Naples in 1916 with Naples, Puteoli, Bagnolese and Internazionale and finished in 3rd place. During the Great War he won the third-rate Campano championship and on 3 November 1919 lost the play-off for admission to the First Category against Pro Caserta, he participated in the Promotion League 1919-1920 where, although he came third, he was admitted to the First Category 1920-1921 for the enlargement of federal cadres. In this period the club absorbed the second town team of Pro Italia, and on 13 June 1920 the Campo Oncino was inaugurated.
In the first two seasons in top flight the club did not pass the regional phase, obtaining a third and a second place, with first driving Fornari and then Garozzo. Subsequently, even under the control of Voiello, there was the first and biggest winning cycle in the history of the club, which won three consecutive titles of champion of Campania, a title of champion of central-southern Italy and disputed the double final Scudetto of 1924 lost against the Genoa. Until then the champions of central-southern Italy had always suffered defeats by the great clubs of the north, but after the honorable defeat of the first leg by 3–1, in the return leg the Savoia entered the history of Italian football by drawing for 1- 1 with the eight-time champions of Italy, becoming the first club in central-southern Italy to end a race. Coach of that triennium was Raffaele Di Giorgio supported by Wisbar in the last two years. This is the eleventh second in the league: Visciano, Nebbia, Lobianco, Cassese, Gaia, Borghetto, Orsini, Ghisi I, Bobbio, Mombelli, Maltagliati.
From the thirties, in the first five years of which was the name of Fascio Sportivo Savoia, the club played steadily in Serie C until after the war, excluding the two years 1936–1938, becoming first Football Association Torre Annunziata and then Spolettificio Torre Annunziata, in fact a team military consisting mainly of footballers who held the lever in the city barracks, which regained the Serie C dominating the league with fourteen wins and a draw in sixteen matches. With the purchase of Enrico Colombari, who ended his career as a footballer in Torre Annunziata and started as a coach, the club ranked second in 1938-1939 behind the MATER of Fulvio Bernardini ; then, with Osvaldo Sacchi as a trainer, he obtained in 1939 the best result ever in the Italian Cup, in which he reached the final sixteenths; subsequently, with Ruggero Zanolla, he arrived fifth in 1940–41 and third in 1942–43.
In 1944, for political reasons, had to renounce both the emblem of the Savoy, the symbol of the club, both the name changed first in Ilva Torrese and then in Unione Sportiva Torrese. During the last years of the Second World War he participated in the 1944 Liberation Cup and the 1945 Campano Mixed Championship, placing himself second and ninth respectively. At the resumption of the championships the Torrese was classified fourth in 1945–46, which thanks to the renunciations of Benevento and Gladiator, earned it the first promotion in Serie B of its history. Under the presidency Carotenuto, the technical guide of Dario Compiani and with the goals of the attacking trio Eugenio Calleri, Renato Ghezzi and Secondo Rossi, the team was classified sixth in 1946–47, which is today the highest point reached by the company from the establishment of the single round. With the reduction of the federal cadres, the 12th place of 1948 sanctioned the return in Serie C. From that year the club began to weaken by establishing a slow decline in which there were 4 retrocessions compared to a single promotion up to the bankrupt in 1955, the year that also saw the closure of the Campo Formisano that had hosted the whites for about a quarter of a century.

U.S. Savoia 
In 1955 a new club restarts as Unione Sportiva Savoia 1908, relegating down to Serie D and even Promozione. Two consecutive promotions, in 1964 and 1965, led Savoia to Serie C, where however played just for one season.

In 1978/1979, Savoia was admitted by the Italian Football Federation to the newborn Serie C2 division, playing at that level until 1981/1982. Savoia returned to play Serie C2 eight years later, and promoted to Serie C1 in 1994/1995 after playoffs under coach Luigi De Canio. In 1998/1999, under coach Osvaldo Jaconi, popular for his successful years at Castel di Sangro, Savoia qualified for the Serie B promotion playoffs. In the playoff semifinals, Savoia sensationally eliminated Palermo, winning both the matches, and defeating 2–0 Juve Stabia in a final, and also a derby between two rival teams. In 1999/2000, despite a fairly good start, Savoia quickly entered into crisis, and Jaconi was fired at the 14th day, being replaced by Franco Varrella, who however was unable to save the team from relegation. After an unenthusiastic Serie C1 campaign in 2000/2001, in the next summer Savoia was cancelled because of financial troubles. On those days, an Eccellenza club from Naples, Internapoli, accepted to relocate to Torre Annunziata and switched its denomination to Intersavoia, quickly obtaining promotion to Serie D. Following that promotion, the team has assumed the former denomination.

At the end of the 2008–09 Serie D season the club was relegated to Eccellenza, but was excluded from that championship during the following season.

A.C. Savoia 1908 
In the summer 2010 the club was refounded as A.S.D. Calcio Savoia and restarts from Promozione: in this season 2010–11 it was promoted to Eccellenza Campania and became the current denomination. Also in the next season it was promoted, now to Serie D. In the season 2013–14 it was promoted to Lega Pro as Serie D/I winners. The next season they were relegated back down to Serie D.

In the season 2017–2018 it was promoted to Serie D as Eccellenza Campania winners. In the summer of 2018 the club was renamed U.S. Savoia 1908.

The club moved back to Eccellenza in 2021 after swapping their football title with Giugliano.

In November 2022 the club was acquired by a consortium headed by Emanuele Filiberto of Savoy, Prince of Venice, who was appointed as the new chairman.

Honours 
Southern Italy Football Championship:
Winners: 1923–24

Eccellenza Campania:
Winners (2): 2011–12, 2017–18
 Regional Coppa Italia Campania:
Winners (2): 2011–12, 2017–18

Bibliography

References 

Football clubs in Campania
Torre Annunziata
Association football clubs established in 1908
Serie B clubs
Serie C clubs
Serie D clubs
1908 establishments in Italy
Phoenix clubs (association football)
2021 establishments in Italy
2015 establishments in Italy
2010 establishments in Italy
2001 establishments in Italy
1955 establishments in Italy
1936 establishments in Italy
1929 establishments in Italy